Julian V. Montellano Carrasco (1900 in Villa Abecia – 1989) served as the 25th vice president of Bolivia from 1945 to 1946, during the presidency of Gualberto Villarroel.

References

1900 births
1989 deaths
Vice presidents of Bolivia